The Indian Women's League, known as Hero Indian Women's League for sponsorship ties with Hero MotoCorp is the women's top tier professional football league in Indian football. Founded in 2016, currently a total of 18 teams from across the country will participate in the league from 2022-23 Season. 

The competition was planned since 2014 and got established in 2016, with the first season starting from October 2016 in Cuttack. The league was launched as India's first professional football league for women with the aim to increase the player pool for India national team. Since 2019–20, the clubs that become champions are granted an opportunity to play in the AFC Women's Club Championship, the top tier women's club football competition in Asia.

Until now four clubs have crowned champions: Eastern Sporting Union, Rising Students' Club, Sethu and Gokulam Kerala. Out of them Gokulam Kerala lifted the championship trophy twice.

History

Origin
Since 1991, the top women's football tournament in India has been the Senior Women's National Football Championship, organised by the All India Football Federation. The tournament served as a female equivalent of the Santosh Trophy, with regional teams competing against each other. There had not been an organized national football league for women clubs; however, the first women's football league was set up by the  Indian Football Association (West Bengal) in Kolkata as Calcutta Women's Football League in 1993. Regional leagues were also organised in Mumbai and Goa in 1998 and 1999 respectively by the respective state associations. But unfortunately due to lack of support, these amateur leagues were postponed for a long period or completely dissolved after a short run.

Foundation
In 2014, after the success of the India women's team, mainly in the SAFF Women's Championship, a push to start a women's football league, along the lines of recently inaugurated and successful Indian Super League, happened. Clubs such as Pune and Bengaluru expressed interests in joining a national women's league. It was around this time that AIFF started plans to create a league for women along the lines of ISL.

On 21 April 2016, the AIFF president Praful Patel said that Indian Women's League would kick-off in October with six teams to be decided, and goal to expand to eight teams by 2017. Over two months later, on 5 July, AIFF organized a workshop to discuss the India women's national team and proposed women's football league. Five Indian Super League sides– Delhi Dynamos, Chennaiyin, Kerala Blasters, Pune City and Atletico de Kolkata, and three I-League teams– Bengaluru, Aizawl and Mumbai, attended the workshop. It was announced that the league would feature eight teams and two other spots would be determined through a preliminary round. The primary objective of the tournament was to capitalise the potential of Indian women and prepare them for the national team, so as to eventually qualify for AFC Women's Asian Cup and FIFA Women's World Cup. 

The preliminary round of the inaugural season was played from 17–26 October in Cuttack by 8 teams qualifying through a national qualifier of 20 teams across the country, and the main round of six teams took place the following year from 28 January to 14 February in New Delhi. The six teams to participate in the main round were Aizawl, Alakhpura, Eastern Sporting Union, Jeppiaar Institute, Pune City and Rising Students' Club, and top four teams are decided to play the semi-finals after a single round-robin stage. Aizawl and Pune City were the only clubs from I-League and ISL to field their women teams in the competition and had achieved direct qualification in main round. Eastern Sporting Union defeated Rising Students' Club by 3–0 in the final and became the inaugural champion of IWL.

Expansion and improvements (2017–present)
The following season, the AIFF extended their partnership with Hero MotoCorp and branded the league as Hero IWL. The organisers also allowed the signing of foreign players in the main round but restricted to only two foreigners in matchday squad, while only one could be named in the starting eleven. This season no ISL or I-League club, except Gokulam Kerala, participated in the competition, therefore six teams were promoted from the preliminary round to the main round. Gokulam Kerala became the first Indian club to sign a foreigner, as they included two Ugandan internationals– Fazila Ikwaput and Rita Nabbosa. The only other club to sign foreigners was Sethu: Bangladeshi internationals Sabina Khatun and Krishna Rani Sarkar, and Indian-born British midfielder Tanvie Hans. The preliminary round was played at Kolhapur from 25 November to 8 December 2017 among thirteen teams, and the main round was held from 26 March to 14 April 2018 in Shillong. Last season's finalists met once again in the finals, but Rising Students' Club beat Eastern Sporting Union this time in the penalties to win the league. From 2018–19 season, the qualification of teams was decided based on the results in respective state leagues, and the number of teams was also doubled to twelve. The format was also changed, and teams were divided into two groups to decide the top two from each group playing in the semi-finals. The season culminated with Sethu becoming the champion of IWL. Since 2019, AFC and FIFA jointly organised AFC Women's Club Championship, and India decided to participate in the second edition of the competition to be held in 2021 AFC Women's Club Championship. Therefore, the winner of the 2019–20 season was decided to be the probable representative of India in the continental tournament. At the final of the tournament, Gokulam Kerala became the champion of the season after remaining unbeaten throughout the tournament, thus became the first club to win the top-tier league of both men's and women's, and also the first Indian team to play in AFC Women's Club Championship. In 2021–22, the AIFF changed the format to a single round-robin tournament and the team that would remain at the top of the table at the end, would be declared as the champions. Gokulam Kerala became the first club to defend their league title by finishing the season unbeaten, hence qualifying for the continental tournament for the second time in a row. In 2022–23, the league got expanded to 18 teams with the top four teams of previous season to be eligible for direct qualification to next season's league irrespective of their results in respective state leagues.

Format
The competition format had varied over the initial seasons, but mostly played as a knock-out tournament where four teams qualified for the single-legged semi-finals through the group stage played in single round-robin format and eventually one would be declared as the champion by winning the final. Currently, the competition follows single round-robin league format of 12 rounds played at a single venue. The winners of respective state tournaments, along with previous season's top four teams, receive direct qualification to the league. The interested clubs from the regions without any state tournament are to register for the IWL Qualifiers and earn a spot in the main round by winning the qualifier. Clubs receive three points for a win, one point for a draw, and no points for a loss, and are ranked by total points, with the highest-ranked club at the end of the season being crowned Champions. If two or more teams are level on points, the following criteria are applied in order until one of the teams can be determined as the higher ranked:
 Highest number of points accumulated in matches between the teams concerned
 Highest goal difference in matches between the teams concerned
 Highest number of goals scored in matches between the teams concerned
 Highest goal difference
 Highest number of goals score
 Lowest number of red cards accumulated
 Lowest number of yellow cards accumulated
 Toss of a coin.

Champions

Performance by season

Performance by club

Media coverage
The first four seasons of the league lacked TV broadcasting, and matches were live streamed on the YouTube channel and the Facebook page of Indian Football. Live updates of matches were also available on the Twitter profile of Indian Football. In 2022, the AIFF reached a deal with Eurosport India to telecast the fifth edition of IWL, but only 30 matches out of total 66 matches were telecasted.

Clubs

Winning head coaches

Stats and players

Top goal scorers

Top scorers by season

See also
Football in India
Women's football in India

References

External links
Official website, the-AIFF.com 

 
2016 establishments in India
I
Football in India
India